is a railway station on the Sanyō Main Line in Inokuchi, Nishi-ku, Hiroshima, operated by West Japan Railway Company (JR West).

Platforms
The station has two side platforms serving two tracks.

Adjacent stations

|-
!colspan=5|JR West

Hiroden
█ Miyajima Line
Line #2
Hiroden Nishi-hiroshima Station — Shoko Center-iriguchi — Inokuchi

Connecting bus routes

Hiroden Bus
From "Hiroden Shin-Inokuchi Station Bus Stop", there are Hiroden Bus routes.
"Hiroden Inokuchidai Parktown Route"
"Hiroshima City Univ. - Alpark Route"
"Itsuki-gaoka - Alpark Route"
"Yamada, Musuzu - Alpark Route"

History
Opened on March 14, 1985.

See also

 List of railway stations in Japan

External links

  

Railway stations in Hiroshima Prefecture
Railway stations in Japan opened in 1985
Sanyō Main Line
Hiroshima City Network
Stations of West Japan Railway Company in Hiroshima city